Talingo is an independent cultural magazine in Panama. It is published monthly.

History and profile
Talingo was founded in 1993 and its first issue appeared on 30 May 1993. The magazine publishes in Spanish on art and culture in a broad context, including cultural criticism. The magazine is edited by La Prensa, one of the biggest newspapers of the country.

In 2001 the magazine was honored with a Prince Claus Award, a major cultural award from the Netherlands.

References

External links 
Official website

1993 establishments in Panama
Cultural magazines
Magazines established in 1993
Mass media in Panama
Spanish-language magazines
Visual arts magazines